Deptford is a National Rail station in Deptford in London, England.

It is in Travelcard zone 2.

History
Opened in 1836, Deptford station is the oldest railway station in London that is still in use. It came into existence when the London and Greenwich Railway opened its first section between Spa Road, Bermondsey, and Deptford on 8 February 1836, with an intermediate station at Southwark Park. The line was extended westwards to the new London Bridge Station on 14 December 1836 and eastwards to Greenwich on 24 December 1838.

Deptford station was closed between 1915 and 1926. The original station building was demolished by the Southern Railway and replaced by a newer building, which was demolished around 2011.

The replacement building was opened on Thursday 26 April 2012; this rebuild has made the station fully accessible. A second entry/exit is now open since the refurbishment of the old carriage ramp is now complete; this new entrance is located on Platform 1. There are two ticket machines in the station, one 
in the ticket hall and the other next to the carriage ramp entrance on Platform 1.

Services

The typical off-peak service in trains per hour is:
 2 tph to London Cannon Street
 2 tph to 
 2 tph to  via 

During the peak hours, the station is served by an additional half-hourly circular service to and from London Cannon Street via  and Lewisham in the clockwise direction and direct to   anticlockwise.

References

External links

Railway stations in the London Borough of Lewisham
Former South Eastern Railway (UK) stations
Railway stations in Great Britain opened in 1836
Railway stations in Great Britain closed in 1838
Railway stations in Great Britain opened in 1838
Railway stations in Great Britain closed in 1915
Railway stations in Great Britain opened in 1926
Railway stations served by Southeastern
Deptford
Railway stations served by Govia Thameslink Railway